The 1973 UCI Road World Championships took place on 2 September 1973 in Montjuich, Barcelona, Spain, with four events contested. Italian Felice Gimondi and Belgian Nicole Vandenbroeck took the individual open championships, while Poland's Ryszard Szurkowski won the men's amateur road race and helped win the men's team time trial.

Results

Medal table

External links 

 Men's results
 Women's results
  Results at sportpro.it

 
UCI Road World Championships by year
Uci Road World Championships, 1973
Cycling competitions in Spain
1973 in road cycling